Löki Gale Tobin is an American politician serving as a member of the Alaska Senate for the I district. Elected in November 2022, she assumed office on January 17, 2023.

Early life and education 
Tobin was born in Nome, Alaska. She earned a Bachelor of Arts degree in psychology and sociology from the University of Alaska Anchorage and a Master of Arts in rural development from the University of Alaska Fairbanks.

Career 
From 2008 to 2011, Tobin volunteered with the Peace Corps in Zaqatala, Azerbaijan, through the organization's Master's International program. From 2012 to 2014, Tobin worked as a consultant for Kawerak, a consortium of Native American tribes. From 2013 to 2015, Tobin was the director of communications and donor relations for the Alaska Community Foundation. She worked as the annual giving manager of the Anchorage Museum Association from 2015 to 2019. From 2019 to 2022, Tobin served as the policy director for State Senator Tom Begich. She was elected to the Alaska Senate in November 2022.

References 

Living people
Alaska Democrats
Alaska state senators
Women state legislators in Alaska
People from Nome, Alaska
University of Alaska Anchorage alumni
University of Alaska Fairbanks alumni
Year of birth missing (living people)